The Association of Cancer Physicians (ACP) is a specialty association in the United Kingdom for medical oncologists. The ACP is recognised by the Royal College of Physicians and the Department of Health, and provides training and regular meetings for members.

Membership of the ACP gives medical oncologists an independent voice in the affairs of the Royal College of Physicians, the Joint Collegiate Council for Oncology (JCCO) and the Specialty Advisory Committee (SAC), who supervise training and accreditation.

Through this, we:
 Promote the views and interests of medical oncologists to the DoH and RCP
 Influence policy on consultant expansion
 Develop training curricula and the upcoming specialty examination
 Participate in NICE appraisal and guideline development
 Encourage the development of best practice to benefit patients
 Nominate members for National Clinical Excellence Awards

Meetings and workshops

Calendar of Events

2017
 18–19 March:  The Association of Cancer Physicians New Consultants Group Meeting, Manchester
 15–16 June: UK Oncology Forum Conference and Annual General Meeting of the Association of Cancer Physicians, Birmingham
 13 October: The Association of Cancer Physicians Workshop on Immunotherapies, Manchester
 14–15 October: The Association of Cancer Physicians Trainees Weekend, Manchester
2016
 12 March: The Association of Cancer Physicians New Consultants Group Meeting, Manchester
 14 October: The Association of Cancer Physicians Workshop on Patient Centred and Integrated Cancer Care, Manchester
 15–16 October: The Association of Cancer Physicians Trainees Weekend, Manchester
 7 November: The Association of Cancer Physicians Annual General Meeting, NCRI Conference, Liverpool
 11 November: The Late Medical Effects of Cancer Treatment, The Royal College of Physicians, London
2015
 Friday 6 March 	Third Symposium on primary breast cancer in older women, East Midlands Conference Centre, Nottingham
 7–8 March 	ACP New Consultants Group Weekend, Hyatt Regency Hotel, Birmingham
 18 September 	British Geriatrics Society Oncogeriatrics Special Interest Group Meeting, Wellcome Collection, London
 17–18 October 	ACP Cancer Physicians in Training weekend, DoubleTree by Hilton, Manchester Piccadilly

Publications  

 Response to 'Cancer Drug, Ethics and Survival' published in the BMJ
 Association of Cancer Physicians Strategy, published in eCancer
 Letter to the Secretary of State for Health regarding junior doctors' contract
 Review of the Pattern of Cancer Services in England and Wales, Southampton

Textbooks
 Problem Solving through Precision Medicine, Clinical Publishing, 2016
 Problem Solving in Old Cancer Patients, Clinical Publishing, 2015 - Winner of the BMA Medical Books Awards, 2016
 Problem Solving in Acute Oncology, Clinical Publishing, 2014

See also
 Cancer in the United Kingdom
 Cancer
 Immunotherapy 
 Precision Medicine
 Chemotherapy
 Experimental cancer treatments
 Clinical Trials

References

External links
 ACP - Medical Oncologists
 Executive Committee
 ACP Constitution. Previously Updated July 1997, Revised July 2001

Cancer organisations based in the United Kingdom
Medical associations based in the United Kingdom